The Aosta Valley (  (official) or  (usual);  ; ;  or) is a mountainous autonomous region in northwestern Italy. It is bordered by Auvergne-Rhône-Alpes, France, to the west, Valais, Switzerland, to the north, and by Piedmont, Italy, to the south and east. The regional capital is Aosta.

The province of Aosta having been dissolved in 1945, the Aosta Valley region was the first region of Italy to abolish provincial subdivisions. Provincial administrative functions are provided by the regional government. The region is divided into 74 comuni.

The official languages are Italian and French, though the native population also speak Valdôtain, a dialect of Franco-Provençal. Italian is spoken as a mother tongue by 77.29% of population, Valdôtain by 17.91%, and French by 1.25%. In 2009, reportedly 50.53% of the population could speak all three languages.

Geography

The Aosta Valley is an Alpine valley which, with its tributary valleys, includes the Italian slopes of Mont Blanc, Monte Rosa, Gran Paradiso and the Matterhorn; its highest peak is Mont Blanc. This makes it the highest region in Italy, according to the list of Italian regions by highest point.

Climate

The valleys, usually above , annually have a Cold Continental Climate (Dfc). In this climate, the snow season is very long, as long as 8 or 9 months at the highest points. During the summer, mist occurs almost every day. These areas are the wettest in the western Alps.

Areas between  usually have a Tundra Climate (ET), where every month has an average temperature below . This climate may be either a kind of more severe Cold Oceanic Climate, with a low summer average but mild winters, sometimes above , especially near lakes, or a more severe Cold Continental Climate, with a very low winter average. It is the coldest place in Italy where the climate is verifiable.

In the past, above , all months had an average temperature below freezing, with a Perpetual Frost Climate (EF). In recent years, however, there has been a rise in temperatures. See, as an example, the data for Plateau Rosa.

History

Early inhabitants of the Aosta Valley were Celts and Ligures, whose language heritage remains in some local placenames. Rome conquered the region from the local Salassi around 25 BC and founded Augusta Prætoria Salassorum (modern-day Aosta) to secure the strategic mountain passes, and they went on to build bridges and roads through the mountains. Thus, the name Valle d'Aosta literally means "Valley of Augustus".

In 1031–1032, Humbert I of Savoy, the founder of the House of Savoy, received the title Count of Aosta from Emperor Conrad II of the Franconian line and built himself a commanding fortification at Bard. Saint Anselm of Canterbury was born in Aosta in 1033 or 1034. The region was divided among strongly fortified castles, and in 1191, Thomas I of Savoy found it necessary to grant to the communes a Charte des franchises ("Charter of Liberties") which preserved autonomy—rights that were fiercely defended until 1770, when they were revoked in order to tie Aosta more closely to Piedmont, but which were again demanded during post-Napoleonic times. In the mid-13th century, Emperor Frederick II made the County of Aosta a duchy (see Duke of Aosta), and its arms charged with a lion rampant were carried in the Savoy arms until the reunification of Italy in 1870.

The region remained part of Savoy lands, with the exceptions of French occupations from 1539 to 1563, later in 1691, then between 1704 and 1706. It was also ruled by the First French Empire between 1800 and 1814. During French rule, it was part of Aoste arrondissement in Doire department. As part of the Kingdom of Sardinia, it joined the new Kingdom of Italy in 1861.

French forces briefly controlled the area at the end of World War II, but withdrew under British and American pressure. The region gained special autonomous status after the end of World War II; the province of Aosta ceased to exist in 1945.

Government and politics

For decades, the valley has been dominated by autonomist regional parties such as the Valdostan Union, which represents the interests of the French-speaking population. The last regional election was held in September 2020. On 15 October 2020, Erik Lavévaz of the Valdostan Union was elected president by the region's cabinet.

Demographics

The population density of Aosta Valley is by far the lowest of the Italian regions. In 2008, 38.9 inhabitants per km2 were registered in the region, whereas the average national figure was 198.8, though the region has extensive uninhabitable areas of mountain and glacier, with a substantial part of the population living in the central valley. Migration from tributary valleys has now been stemmed by generous regional support for agriculture and tourist development. 

Negative natural population growth since 1976 has been more than offset by immigration. The region has one of Italy's lowest birth rates, with a rising average age. This, too, is partly compensated by immigration, since most immigrants arriving in the region are younger people working in the tourist industry. Between 1991 and 2001, the population of Aosta Valley grew by 3.1%, which is the highest growth among the Italian regions. With a negative natural population growth, this is due exclusively to positive net migration. Between 2001 and 2011, the population of Aosta Valley grew by a further 7.07%. , the Italian National Institute of Statistics (ISTAT) estimated that 4,976 foreign-born immigrants live in Aosta Valley, equal to 4.0% of the total regional population.

The Valdôtain population and their language dialects have been the subject of some sociological research.

Culture

Languages

The Aosta Valley was the first government authority to adopt Modern French as the official language in 1536, three years before France itself.

Since 1946, Italian and French have been the region's official languages and are used for the regional government's acts and laws, though Italian is much more widely spoken in everyday life, and French is mostly spoken in cultural life. Education is conducted evenly in French and Italian, so that anyone who has gone to school in the Aosta Valley can speak French to at least a medium-high level.

The regional language, known as patoué valdotèn or simply patoué (patois valdôtain in French), is a dialectal variety of Franco-Provençal. It is spoken as a native and second language by 68,000 residents, or about 58% of the population according to a sociolinguistic survey carried out by the Fondation Émile Chanoux in 2001.

The survey found out that the Italian language was spoken as a mother tongue by 77.29% of respondents, Franco-Provençal by 17.91%, while French by 1.25%. The residents of the villages of Gressoney-Saint-Jean, Gressoney-La-Trinité and Issime, in the Lys Valley, speak two dialects of Walser German, Titsch and Töitschu, respectively. According to the survey, Walser German was spoken as a mother tongue by 207 people, or 17.78%, in these three villages. Nevertheless, it was known to 56.38% of the population.

Castles

There are numerous medieval castles and fortified houses in the Aosta Valley, including Châtel-Argent, Saint-Pierre Castle, Fénis Castle, Issogne Castle, Ussel Castle, Sarre Castle, Cly Castle, Verrès Castle, and Châtelard Castle. Savoy Castle in Gressoney-Saint-Jean was conceived in the 19th century and completed in 1904. Since 1990, it has also been home to the Savoy Castle Alpine Botanical Garden.

Cuisine
The cuisine of Aosta Valley is characterized by simplicity and revolves around "robust" ingredients such as potatoes, polenta; cheese and meat; and rye bread. Many of the dishes involve Fontina, a cheese with PDO status, made from cow's milk that originates from the valley. It is found in dishes such as the soup à la vâpeuleunèntse (Valpelline Soup). Other cheeses made in the region are Tomme de Gressoney and Seras. Fromadzo (Valdôtain for cheese) has been produced locally since the 15th century and also has PDO status.

Regional specialities, besides Fontina, are Motzetta (dried chamois meat), Vallée d'Aoste Lard d'Arnad (a cured and brined fatback product with PDO designation), Vallée d'Aoste Jambon de Bosses (a kind of ham, likewise with PDO designation), a dark bread made with rye, and honey.

Notable dishes include Carbonnade, similar to the Belgian dish of the same name consisting of salt-cured beef cooked with onions and red wine served with polenta; breaded veal cutlets called costolette; teuteuns, salt-cured cow's udder that is cooked and sliced; and steak à la valdôtaine, a steak with croûtons, ham and melted cheese.

Wine growing

Notable wines include two white wines from Morgex (Blanc de Morgex et de La Salle and Chaudelune), a red wine blend from Arvier (Enfer d'Arvier) and one from Gamay.

Frazione
 

Lillaz

Gallery

See also

 Alps-Mediterranean Euroregion
 Arch of Augustus in Aosta
 Roman Catholic Diocese of Aosta
 Elections in Aosta Valley
 Fort Bard—Museum of the Alps
 Gran Paradiso National Park
 List of presidents of Aosta Valley
 Mont Blanc
 Mont Blanc Tunnel
 Roman bridge Pont d'Aël
 Refuge Grand Tournalin
 Roman Theatre, Aosta
 13th-century bridge of Grand Arvou

References

Sources

External links

 Website of the Aosta Valley Regional Authority (in Italian and French)

 
Autonomous regions of Italy
Arpitania
Provinces of Italy
Regions of Italy
Valleys of Italy
Valleys of the Alps
Castles in Aosta Valley
French-speaking countries and territories
NUTS 2 statistical regions of the European Union
Regions of Europe with multiple official languages
Wine regions of Italy